The  500 George Street  is a proposed residential skyscraper to be located at 500 George Street in Brisbane, Australia. The building comprises 144 serviced apartments and student accommodation from level 8 to 25 as well as 248 one and two bedroom residential apartments from level 26 to 56. A full floor resident's sky pool and terrace will be located on level 58. The development involves the retention of the historic King George Chambers building at the front of the site as a foyer and the main pedestrian access point to the new tower.

Development application was lodged with the Brisbane City Council in June 2015.

See also

List of tallest buildings in Brisbane

References

External links
 Building at The Skyscraper Center database 

Skyscrapers in Brisbane
Residential skyscrapers in Australia
Proposed skyscrapers in Australia